BCV: Battle Construction Vehicles, known in Japan as , is a non-traditional fighting video game for the PlayStation 2 game console, where the player must battle in various construction vehicles.

The game was only released in Europe and Japan. It was also one of the first PlayStation 2 titles to be released in DVD-ROM format, rather than CD-ROM as most early PS2 titles were.
The story in this game revolves around the player settling construction site contracts through vehicular combat with various rival companies over the course of 16 levels. The player uses vehicles commonly found on construction sites like diggers and bulldozers. Additional characters can be unlocked by playing the story. The European release notably gives the characters English accents.

References

External links
 at Artdink 
Video Review at BN-Games.com 

2000 video games
Artdink games
Fighting games
PlayStation 2 games
PlayStation Network games
Multiplayer and single-player video games
Vehicular combat games
Video games developed in Japan